Hemiphyllodactylus harterti, also known commonly as the Bintang slender gecko or Hartert's slender gecko, is a species  of gecko, a lizard in the family Gekkonidae. The species is endemic to Peninsular Malaysia.

Etymology
The specific name, harterti, is in honor of German ornithologist Ernst Johann Otto Hartert.

Reproduction
Unlike other species of Hemiphyllodactylus which are unisexual (females only), H. harterti is bisexual (males and females).

References

Further reading
Werner F (1900). "Beschreibung einiger noch unbekannter neotropischer und indischer Reptilien ". Zoologischer Anzeiger 23: 196–198. (Lepidodactylus harterti, new species, p. 196). (in German).
Zug GR (2010). "Speciation and Dispersal in a Low Diversity Taxon: The Slender Geckos Hemiphyllodactylus (Reptilia, Gekkonidae)". Smithsonian Contributions to Zoology (631): xi + 70 pp. (Hemiphyllodactylus harterti, pp. 43–44).

Hemiphyllodactylus
Reptiles of Malaysia
Endemic fauna of Malaysia
Taxa named by Franz Werner
Reptiles described in 1900